The Russia women's national under-17 football team is the national under-17 football team of Russia and is governed by the Football Union of Russia. On 28 February 2022, due to the 2022 Russian invasion of Ukraine and in accordance with a recommendation by the International Olympic Committee (IOC), FIFA and UEFA suspended the participation of Russia, including in the Qatar 2022 World Cup. The Russian Football Union unsuccessfully appealed the FIFA and UEFA bans to the Court of Arbitration for Sport, which upheld the bans.

Competitive record

FIFA U-17 Women's World Cup

The team has never qualified for the  FIFA U-17 Women's World Cup

UEFA Women's Under-17 Championship 

The team has never qualified for the UEFA Women's Under-17 Championship

Results at official competitions
Friendly matches are not included.

Player history

Top goalscorers in the European Championships
Goalscorers with an equal number of goals are ranked in chronological order of reaching the milestone. Bold indicates still active players.

References

External links
 Official website
 Website about Russian Women football

under17
Women's national under-17 association football teams